Solomon is a census-designated place in Graham County, Arizona, United States. Its population was 399 as of the 2020 census. It is part of the Safford Micropolitan Statistical Area.

Demographics

As of the 2010 census Solomon had a population of 426.  The ethnic and racial composition of the population was 75.8% Hispanic, 20.9% non-Hispanic white, 0.2% Native American, 0.7% Asian Indian, 0.7% other Asian and 2.8% reporting two or more races.

History

The community's origins go back to the indigenous peoples of the region.  Little is known of its history prior to the coming of Europeans.

In the early 19th century settlers who fit the modern term Hispanic came to the region.  They named the town they founded "Pueblo Viejo" because of the previous Native American settlement, the ruins of which were still visible.

In the 1870s Mormons moved to the region. The Solomon Ward web site says no Mormons moved to Solomon until 1884 They began large scale irrigation. The current name of the town, which was previously known as Solomonville, is for Isadore Elkan Solomon, a German immigrant who came to the town in the 1870s. Solomon was Jewish. He moved to Solomon with his wife and three children, the oldest of whom was three. His wife already had family members in New Mexico. Their first stop in the southwest was in Las Cruces, New Mexico. Mrs. Solomon and the children lived there for four months while I. E. Solomon was searching for a place to start up business, and he eventually settled on the current town of Solomon.  When the Solomons came to town there were only five residences in the town. The idea for the name Solomonville was suggested by the local postman, William H. Kirkland.

From the 1880s to about 1910 Solomonville had over 1000 residents.  In 1898 the town had a baseball team.  From 1873–1915 Solomonville was the seat of Graham County.

In 1906 Frieda Mashbir, the sister of Solomon's wife Anna, was made the postmistress for Solomonville.

In the early 1900s, the town was renamed Solomon.

The Mormons never formed a majority of the town's population.  It is the only town in this specific area besides Safford that has not been historically dominated by Mormons.  It was not until January 1920 that the Church of Jesus Christ of Latter-day Saints organized a branch at Solomon.  It was made a ward the following year, with Elder George Albert Smith presiding over the organizing of the ward.  This first organization of the ward was extremely short lived, since it was made a branch again after less than three months as a ward.  The branch was again made a ward on February 26, 1928.  Leslie W. Layton was the bishop at this time.  The ward had a membership of 182 in 1930 (counting 44 children who were under the age of eight and so not actually baptized church members).  The town and immediate outlying areas had a population of 1,283 people in 1930.

In 1940 there were 753 inhabitants in Solomon.

In 1952 a red brick ward building was dedicated.  In the 1970s under Bishop Rex O. Barney the building was remodeled and added to, and was rededicated November 18, 1979.

In 1979 there were about 250 ward members.  By some time prior to September 2007 the ward had over 450 members.

By the 1990s Solomon itself only had a population of 250

Geography

Present conditions
Solomon has its own school district. The Solomon Unified School District operates one elementary school, serving K–8.

Historic structures pictured

The following is a brief description of the images of some of the remaining historic buildings in Solomon.
Gila Valley Bank Building – built in 1899 and located on Main Street.
A. M. Elias Merchandise – built c. 1900 and located on Main Street.
Abandoned commercial building – built c. 1900 and located on Main Street.
J. Fred Blake & Sons General Store – built c. 1900 and located on Main Street.

Notable people
 Charles Stevens, Apache/Mexican actor
 D. H. Claridge, Arizona state senator

Popular culture
Legend holds that there is large amount of loot stored in the area of Solomon.

See also

 List of census-designated places in Arizona

References

External links

 http://www.library.arizona.edu/exhibits/swja/v24Solomon.htm

Census-designated places in Graham County, Arizona
Safford, Arizona micropolitan area